Mulgi Zali Ho is an Indian Marathi-language television drama which airs on Star Pravah. The show stars Sharvani Pillai, Kiran Mane, Divya Pugaonkar and Yogesh Sohoni in lead roles. It is produced by Suzana Ghai, Hemant Ruprell and Ranjit Thakur under the banner of Panorama Entertainment Pvt. Ltd.

Summary 
Mulgi Zali Ho is about a girl child Sajiri (Mau) who is being rejected. Her father Vilas gives some poison to her mother Uma during her pregnancy because he feels that he can't afford to pay for another daughter. As a result, the girl is being born dumb. Mau does all the house hold works and also goes house to house selling milk. Consequently, she meets a city boy called Shaunak who will be following her daily and remembers her as the child who saved him from a car crash from childhood. Mau, only longs for the affection of her cold and distant father and is oblivious to the love bestowed on her by Shaunak.

Cast

Main 
 Divya Pugaonkar as Sajiri "Mau" Patil Jahagirdar: Vilas and Uma's younger daughter; Akshara and Rohan's sister; Shaunak's wife; Gojiri's mother (2020–2023)
 Maithili Patwardhan as Child Sajiri "Mau" Patil (2020)
 Yogesh Sohoni as Shaunak Jahagirdar: Kedar and Kalyani's son; Divya and Aarya's cousin; Sajiri's husband; Siddhant's best friend; Gojiri's father (2020–2023)

Recurring 
 Aarohi Sambre as Gojiri Jahagirdar: Sajiri and Shaunak's daughter; Anisha and Aaroh's cousin (2022–2023)
 Sharvani Pillai as Uma Patil: Vilas's wife; Akshara, Sajiri and Rohan's mother; Anisha, Aaroh and Gojiri's grandmother (2020–2023)
 Kiran Mane / Anand Alkunte as Vilas Patil: Damayanti's son; Uma's husband; Akshara, Sajiri and Rohan's father; Anisha, Aaroh and Gojiri's grandfather (2020–2022) / (2022–2023)
 Savita Malpekar as Damayanti Patil: Vilas's mother; Akshara, Sajiri and Rohan's grandmother; Anisha, Aaroh and Gojiri's great-grandmother (2020–2023)
 Srujan Deshpande as Rohan Patil: Vilas and Uma's son; Akshara and Sajiri's brother; Aarya's husband; Aaroh's father (2020–2023)
 Apoorva Sapkal / Sheetal Gete as Akshara Patil Bhosale: Vilas and Uma's elder daughter; Sajiri and Rohan's sister; Deepak's ex-wife; Siddhant's wife; Anisha's mother (2020–2021) / (2022–2023)
 Shweta Ambikar-Gore as Aarya Sardeshmukh Patil: Rajan and Vaishali's younger daughter; Divya's sister; Shaunak's cousin; Rohan's wife; Aaroh's mother (2020–2023)
 Siddharth Khirid as Siddhant Bhosale: Revati's son; Shaunak's best friend; Akshara's husband; Anisha's father (2021–2022)
 Soham Salunkhe as Aaroh Patil: Rohan and Aarya's son; Anisha and Gojiri's cousin (2022–2023)
 Vighnesh Joshi as Kedar Jahagirdar: Kalyani's husband; Shaunak's father; Gojiri's grandfather (2021–present)
 Prajakta Kelkar as Kalyani Sardeshmukh Jahagirdar: Suman and Rajan's sister; Kedar's wife; Shaunak's mother; Gojiri's grandmother (2020–present)
 Anand Kale / Ajay Purkar / Ramesh Rokade as Rajan Sardeshmukh: Suman and Kalyani's brother; Vaishali's husband; Divya and Aarya's father; Aaroh's grandfather (2020) / (2020–2022) / (2022–present)
 Pradnya Jawle-Edke as Vaishali Sardeshmukh: Rajan's wife; Divya and Aarya's mother; Aaroh's grandmother (2020–present)
 Pratiksha Mungekar / Rashmi Joshi as Divya Sardeshmukh: Rajan and Vaishali's elder daughter; Aarya's sister; Shaunak's cousin (2020–2021) / (2021–2023)
 Dhanashri Gore as Suman Sardeshmukh: Rajan and Kalyani's sister; Shaunak, Divya and Aarya's aunt (2022–2023)

Others
 Omprakash Shinde as Bhushan Kamat (2022–2023)
 Swapnil Pawar as Deepak Rane: Akshara's ex-husband (2020–2021)
 Sharmistha Raut as Nilima Sawant (2021)
 Prajakta Navnale / Gauri Sonar as Siddhi Gaikwad: Ashok and Seema's daughter; Mau's best friend (2020-2021) / (2021-2022)
 Sudesh Mhashilkar / Santosh Patil as Ashok Gaikwad: Seema's husband; Siddhi's father; Vilas's best friend (2020) / (2020-2022)
 Priti Kadam as Sheetal: Divya's supporter (2020–2021)
 Pankaj Kale as Sunil Shinde: Rajshree's husband; Vilas's best friend (2020–2021)
 Chitra Khare / Manjusha Khetri / Archana Mungekar as Seema Gaikwad: Ashok's wife; Siddhi's mother; Uma's best friend (2020) / (2020–2021) / (2021–2022)
 Devendra Deo as Mr. Bhosale: Siddhant's father (2021)
 Nandini Kulkarni as Revati Bhosale: Siddhant's mother (2021)

Adaptations

Soundtrack 

Mulgi Zali Ho title song's lyrics is penned by Rohini Ninawe. On Mau's naming ceremony, title song's especial male version is released which is sung by Prasenjit Kosambi.

Reception

Mahaepisode

1 hour 
 4 October 2020
 22 November 2020
 6 December 2020
 20 December 2020
 3 January 2021
 17 January 2021
 7 February 2021
 21 February 2021
 7 March 2021
 21 March 2021
 4 July 2021
 29 August 2021
 3 October 2021
 31 October 2021
 26 December 2021
 6 February 2022
 21 August 2022
 30 October 2022
 13 November 2022
 18 December 2022

2 hours 
 11 April 2021 (Mau's Name Ceremony)
 21 November 2021 (Mau-Shaunak's Marriage)

Ratings

References

External links 
 
 Mulgi Zali Ho at Disney+ Hotstar

Marathi-language television shows
Star Pravah original programming
2020 Indian television series debuts
2023 Indian television series endings